Edmund Albert Turton (born 29 November 1932) is a retired athlete from Trinidad and Tobago who competed mainly in the middle distance events. He was born in San Fernando, Trinidad and Tobago. He was a member of Trinidad and Tobago team at the 1956 Summer Olympics in Melbourne, Australia.  He competed in the men's 100 metres and went out in the second round.

External links
 

1932 births
Living people
Trinidad and Tobago male sprinters
Athletes (track and field) at the 1956 Summer Olympics
Olympic athletes of Trinidad and Tobago
People from San Fernando, Trinidad and Tobago